Marinomonas ushuaiensis is a Gram-negative, psychrophilic, rod-shaped, non-spore-forming and motile bacterium from the genus of Marinomonas which has been isolated from coastal sea water from Ushuaia in Argentina.

References

Oceanospirillales
Bacteria described in 2005